Archaeomaene is an extinct genus of ray-finned fish that lived in what is now Australia during the Late Jurassic (Tithonian age). It is a monotypic genus, containing only the species Archaeomaene tenuis, which is known from the Talbragar River beds of New South Wales.

References

dinohunters

Prehistoric teleostei
Prehistoric ray-finned fish genera
Tithonian genera
Late Jurassic bony fish
Jurassic Australia
Mesozoic fish of Australia
Fossil taxa described in 1895